The 2014 FIBA 3x3 World Tour Beijing Masters was a 3x3 basketball tournament that was held in Beijing, China at the Wukesong Hi-Park from 2–3 August 2014. The top team qualified for the 2014 FIBA 3x3 World Tour Final which was held in Sendai, Japan.  The Word Tour Final is branded as a "Tokyo" Final but recently this was changed to Sendai.

Participants
Twelve teams were qualified to participate at the Beijing Masters.

Final standings

References

External links
Beijing Masters Official Website

2014 FIBA 3x3 World Tour
International basketball competitions hosted by China
2014–15 in Chinese basketball